East Menggala (Indonesian: Menggala Timur) is a district located in the Tulang Bawang Regency of Lampung in Sumatra, Indonesia.

Border 
The border district of East Rawajitu as follows:

References 

Tulang Bawang Regency
Districts of Lampung